Cyperus conglomeratus is a species of sedge that is native to northern Africa, the Middle East and parts of western Asia.

The species was first formally described by the botanist Christen Friis Rottbøll in 1773.

See also 
 List of Cyperus species

References 

conglomeratus
Taxa named by Christen Friis Rottbøll
Plants described in 1773
Flora of Afghanistan
Flora of Algeria
Flora of Burkina Faso
Flora of the Central African Republic
Flora of Egypt
Flora of Ethiopia
Flora of Eritrea
Flora of Chad
Flora of Djibouti
Flora of Gabon
Flora of India
Flora of Iran
Flora of Libya
Flora of Kuwait
Flora of Kenya
Flora of Iraq
Flora of Mauritania
Flora of Mali
Flora of Madagascar
Flora of Mauritius
Flora of Oman
Flora of Niger
Flora of Morocco
Flora of Pakistan
Flora of Senegal
Flora of Saudi Arabia
Flora of Somalia
Flora of Seychelles
Flora of Sudan
Flora of Tunisia
Flora of Yemen